UFC 14: Showdown was a mixed martial arts event held by the Ultimate Fighting Championship on July 27, 1997 in Birmingham, Alabama.  The event was seen live on pay-per-view in the United States, and later released on home video.

History
UFC 14 featured two separate tournaments: a heavyweight tournament for fighters 200 lb or more, and a middleweight (formerly lightweight) tournament for fighters under 200 lb. The event also featured a UFC Heavyweight Championship "Superfight" between Mark Coleman and Maurice Smith, as well as two alternate bouts in case of tournament injury.

Showdown was the first UFC event to require all fighters to wear padded gloves, weighing between four and six ounces.  Up until then, it was the fighter's option - Melton Bowen was the first UFC fighter to choose to wear UFC gloves, back in UFC 4. It was also the first UFC appearance of World champion kickboxer Maurice Smith and champion collegiate wrestler Mark Kerr, who was encouraged to try mixed martial arts competition by his friend and training partner, Mark Coleman.

Results

UFC 14 Middleweight tournament bracket

1 Tony Fryklund replaced Joe Moreira who was not medically permitted to continue.

UFC 14 Heavyweight Tournament Bracket

See also 
 Ultimate Fighting Championship
 List of UFC champions
 List of UFC events
 1997 in UFC

References

External links
UFC 14 results at Sherdog.com
Official UFC website

Ultimate Fighting Championship events
1997 in mixed martial arts
Mixed martial arts in Alabama
Sports in Birmingham, Alabama
1997 in Alabama